Lisa Hayley Ambalavanar is an English actress. She is known for her roles as Alia Hanif in the BBC soap opera Doctors (2018–2019) and Mia in the iPlayer and Netflix series The A List (2018–present).

Early life
Ambalavanar was born in Derby. She is of English and Sri Lankan heritage. She trained at the Liverpool Institute of Performing Arts (LIPA).

Career
Ambalavanar made her professional debut in an episode of the BBC Two series Home Time in 2009, appearing as a shop assistant. She then made appearances in projects including short film Coffee (2011) and films The Stuff of Legend (2015) and Like Living (2016). Ambalavanar has also starred in various stage productions, including Painkillers (2014) and Singin' in the Rain (2016). For her performance in Singin' in the Rain, Philip Lowe of East Midlands Theatre wrote that she "lights up the stage with her attractive personality, her comic timing and some beautifully sung numbers". 

In 2018, she was cast in the BBC daytime soap opera Doctors. She made her debut appearance as Alia Hanif on 7 February 2018; Alia was played by Mandy Thandi prior to Ambalavanar taking over the role. Later that year, she began appearing in the iPlayer/Netflix series The A List in the main role of Mia. In 2019, she made an appearance in a production of A View from the Bridge, in which she was described as "forthright, headstrong and full of energy" by Julie Bayley of Derbyshire Live. Later that year, she portrayed the role of Fairy Wiseheart in a production of Sleeping Beauty. She appears as Jinx in Season 4 of Titans on HBO Max.

Filmography

Stage

References

External links
 

Living people
Actresses from Derbyshire
Alumni of the Liverpool Institute for Performing Arts
English actresses of South Asian descent
English people of Sri Lankan descent
English soap opera actresses
English stage actresses
English television actresses
People from Derby
Year of birth missing (living people)